John Henry Worst (December 23, 1850 – September 25, 1945) was a North Dakota Republican Party politician and school administrator. He served as the fourth Lieutenant Governor of North Dakota (1895-1897) under Governor Roger Allin. Worst also served in the North Dakota Senate from 1889 to 1894.

Worst has also involved in education. In the 1880s, he was elected superintendent of schools for Emmons County and served in that role for six years. He served as the president of the North Dakota Agricultural College (now North Dakota State University) from 1895 to 1916.

Worst served as the Commissioner of Immigration for North Dakota from 1919-1923.

Notes

External links

See also
List of presidents of North Dakota State University
Lieutenant Governor of North Dakota

Lieutenant Governors of North Dakota
1850 births
1945 deaths
Presidents pro tempore of the North Dakota Senate
Republican Party North Dakota state senators
19th-century American politicians